The barea moth (Barea codrella) is a moth of the family Oecophoridae. It is found in Australia, more specifically Tasmania, New South Wales and Victoria and South Australia. It is also an adventive species in New Zealand.

References

External links

Oecophorinae
Taxa named by Alois Friedrich Rogenhofer